Geir Magnus Nyborg (February 15, 1951 in Askøy – February 13, 2018 in Bergen) was a Norwegian media scholar and theologian.

Nyborg headed the Christian organization Familie & Medier from 2001 to 2009, and after that headed the training and competence center at Gimlekollen NLA College. He worked in various mass media in Norway and Latin America in production, management, and teaching. He provided the initiative for and was the first editor for the radio station Kystradioen and was also the first editor at the newspaper VestNytt. Nyborg also held several important executive positions, including chairman of the board at the Strømme Foundation (2004–2010) and the radio station P7 Kristen Riksradio (1985–2010), and he was vice-president of the Fellowship of European Broadcasters.

Nyborg received his professional degree (embedseksamen) in theology from the MF Norwegian School of Theology in 1975, his master's degree in communication from Wheaton College in 1982, and his doctorate from the University of Bergen in 1995. His dissertation was titled Conquest, Dominance or Spiritual Reformation? Bolivian Quechua Families Watch US Televangelism.

Nyborg was married to the Christian Democratic Party (Norway) politician Torill Selsvold Nyborg.

References

Mass media scholars
People from Askøy
Norwegian theologians
Norwegian editors
1951 births
2018 deaths
20th-century Lutherans